A chiplet is a tiny integrated circuit (IC) that contains a well-defined subset of functionality. It is designed to be combined with other chiplets on an interposer in a single package. A set of chiplets can be implemented in a mix-and-match "LEGO-like" assembly. This provides several advantages over a traditional system on chip (SoC):

 Reusable IP (Intellectual Property): the same chiplet can be used in many different devices
 Heterogeneous integration: chiplets can be fabricated with different processes, materials, and nodes, each optimized for its particular function
 Known good die: chiplets can be tested before assembly, improving the yield of the final device

Multiple chiplets working together in a single integrated circuit may be called a multi-chip module (MCM), hybrid IC, 2.5D IC, or an advanced package.

Chiplets may be connected with standards such as UCIe, Bunch of Wires (BoW), OpenHBI, and OIF XSR.

See also
 UCIe

References

Integrated circuits
Semiconductor devices